Deividas Pukis (born 10 January 1992, Kaunas, Lithuania) is a Lithuanian professional basketball player whose position is shooting guard. In 2010 he suffered a serious knee injury, which kept him from basketball court for more than a half year.

International career
He won four gold medals with Lithuania national teams: Europe U-16 in 2008, Europe U-18 in 2010, World U-19 in 2011 and Europe U-20 in 2012. He also was a part of U-18 all-tournament team in 2008.

References

Living people
1992 births
Lithuanian men's basketball players
Lithuanian expatriate basketball people in Spain
Lithuanian expatriate basketball people in the United States
People from Šilutė
Shooting guards
CB Peñas Huesca players